Hamid Bahi Fadul (born 28 August 1961) is a Sudanese judoka. He competed in the men's half-middleweight event at the 1992 Summer Olympics.

References

External links
 

1961 births
Living people
Sudanese male judoka
Olympic judoka of Sudan
Judoka at the 1992 Summer Olympics
Place of birth missing (living people)